The 8th Executive Committee of the Lao People's Revolutionary Party (LPRP), officially the Executive Committee of the 8th National Congress of the Lao People's Revolutionary Party, was elected in 2006 by the 1st Plenary Session of the 8th Central Committee in 2011.

Members

References

Specific

Bibliography
Articles:
 

8th Executive Committee of the Lao People's Revolutionary Party
2006 establishments in Laos
2011 disestablishments in Laos